Tjorn Dirk Sibma (born 12 April 1977) is an Australian politician. He was elected to the Western Australian Legislative Council at the 2017 state election, as a Liberal member in North Metropolitan Region. His term began on 22 May 2017.

Sibma previously worked as a staffer for the Barnett Government.

References

1977 births
Living people
Liberal Party of Australia members of the Parliament of Western Australia
Members of the Western Australian Legislative Council
Australian people of Dutch descent
Australian people of English descent
21st-century Australian politicians